Carr Hervey was one of the two MPs for Bury St Edmunds between 1713 and 1722.

References

Hervey